Duván Esteban Zapata Banguero (born 1 April 1991) is a Colombian professional footballer who plays as a forward for  club Atalanta and the Colombia national team.

After starting his career with Colombian club América de Cali, he later played for Estudiantes in Argentina. From 2013, he played in Italy's Serie A, for Napoli, Udinese, Sampdoria, and Atalanta.

At international level, Zapata made his senior debut for Colombia in 2017, and took part at the 2019 and 2021 Copa América.

Club career

America de Cali 
Zapata joined América de Cali's youth academy aged 13 in 2004, and made his debut with the first team on 18 May 2008, during a 3–2 loss against Boyaca Chico, where he also scored a goal. In July 2008, Zapata started in both legs of the finals against Boyaca Chico, who later beat America on penalties to win the league title. In December 2008, America de Cali won the league title by beating Independiente Medellín in the finals, but Zapata didn't participate in either match. 

On 13 February 2011, he scored a hat-trick, the first of his career, in a 3–2 home victory against Deportivo Pereira at Estadio Pascual Guerrero. At the end of the 2011 Apertura, Zapata left the club.

Estudiantes
On 27 July 2011, joined Estudiantes on loan for a $120,000 loan fee with an option for Estudiantes to purchase for $1.2 million. On his debut, Zapata scored a goal in a 3–2 win over Belgrano. During his first year with Estudiantes, Zapata would occasionally make appearances with their reserve team. Despite this, he still managed to score four goals in eight matches in the Torneo Clausura 2012. That year, within both the Apertura and Clasura, Zapata scored 5 goals in 11 matches. During the summer of 2012, Estudiantes purchased half of Zapata's playing rights from América de Cali.

For the 2013–13 season, Zapata featured in Estudiantes' starting 11, eventually turning into a fundamental part of the team and attracting interest from many European clubs like Beşiktaş, after scoring 16 goals in 33 games.

In July 2013, Premier League club West Ham United applied for a British work permit for Zapata ahead of a possible transfer from Estudiantes. Although not meeting the usual requirements for a permit, West Ham attempted to secure his arrival by claiming he was a "special talent" who would enhance the English game. However, West Ham's owners soon announced on social media they were pulling out of the deal, even after agreeing a ₤6.7 million fee with Estudiantes.

Napoli

On 25 August 2013, Zapata transferred to Serie A club Napoli for an undisclosed fee. He made his first start in Serie A on 28 September, in a 2–0 Napoli win against Genoa. On 22 October, he scored his first goal in the UEFA Champions League, against Marseille in a 2–1 away win.

Zapata scored his first league goals for the Partenopei on 26 March 2014, two in a 4–2 win at Catania in which his team got all their goals in the first half. He finished the season with five to his name, including two more in the last match, a 5–1 win over Hellas Verona at the Stadio San Paolo.

On 22 July 2015, Zapata joined Udinese on a two-year loan deal with the option to purchase him after his first year at the club.

On 31 August 2017, Zapata joined Sampdoria on a season-long loan deal with an obligation to purchase.

Atalanta
On 12 July 2018, Zapata joined Atalanta on a two-season loan deal with an option to purchase.

On 26 December 2018, Zapata scored twice in a 2–2 draw against Juventus. Later on 20 January 2019, Zapata scored four goals in a 5–0 away win versus Frosinone, becoming the first Atalanta player since Hasse Jeppson in 1952 to achieve this feat in Serie A. The goals lifted his tally up to 14 goals, all scored consecutively in his last 8 matches, making him the top scorer of the league jointly with Cristiano Ronaldo and Fabio Quagliarella.

On 30 January 2019, Zapata scored twice in a 3–0 win against holders Juventus in the quarter final stage of Coppa Italia. After helping Atalanta to reach the 2019 Coppa Italia Final, and achieve a third-place finish in Serie A, and consequently a spot in the Champions League, scoring 23 league goals in the process, Zapata was awarded a spot in the Serie A team of the year at the end of the season.

On 1 October 2019, Zapata scored Atalanta's first ever goal in the UEFA Champions League in a 2–1 loss against Shakhtar Donetsk.

On 17 January 2020, Atalanta exercised their option to purchase Zapata's rights on a permanent basis. A week later, he scored his first goal since his return from a three-month injury in a 7–0 rout of Torino. On 11 July, Zapata scored his 15th goal of the season in a 2–2 draw against Juventus, making it the first time since Juventus in 1952 that a Serie A club had three players with 15 or more goals in a season (Muriel, Iličić, Zapata). On 27 October 2020, he scored a brace in a 2–2 draw against Ajax in the 2020–21 UEFA Champions League. Zapata became Atalanta's joint-highest non-Italian goalscorer in Serie A on 15 May 2021, alongside Germán Denis, scoring his 56th league goal for the club against Genoa.

International career
Zapata received his first call-up to the Colombia national team for 2018 FIFA World Cup qualifying matches against Bolivia and Ecuador in March 2017. He made his debut on 23 March, as a 64th-minute substitute for Mateus Uribe in a 1–0 home win over Bolivia.

In May 2018, Zapata was named in Colombia's preliminary 35-man squad for the 2018 World Cup tournament proper, in Russia. However, he did not make the final 23-man squad.

On 30 May 2019, Zapata was included in the 23-man final Colombia squad for the 2019 Copa América. In a pre-tournament friendly on 9 June he scored his first international goal at the end of a 3–0 win away to Peru, having replaced Radamel Falcao at half time. He then scored in the first two group games in Brazil, against Argentina (2–0) and Qatar (1–0).

In June 2021, he was included in Colombia's squad for the 2021 Copa América in Brazil. He successfully converted Colombia's first penalty kick in the quarter-final shoot-out against Uruguay. Colombia would eventually eliminate Uruguay 4–2 on penalties following a 0–0 draw. Ultimately, Colombia achieved a third-place finish with Zapata failing to score despite appearing in a total of 7 matches.

Style of play
Zapata is primarily known for his speed, offensive movement, physicality, and goalscoring ability as a striker. He usually plays in a central role, and possesses a powerful and accurate shot. He is also known for his ability in the air, courtesy of his height, strength, and powerful physique, which also aids him in defending the ball with his back to goal, and enables him to hold up possession and bring his teammates into the game with his link-up play; he is also adept in one on one situations due to his technique and agility. Moreover, he is known for is defensive work-rate and willingness to press opponents off the ball.

Personal life
Zapata is the cousin of fellow Colombia international footballer and current San Lorenzo defender Cristián Zapata.

Career statistics

Club

International

Scores and results list Colombia's goal tally first, score column indicates score after each Zapata goal.

Honours
América de Cali
Categoría Primera A: 2008–II

Napoli
 Coppa Italia: 2013–14
 Supercoppa Italiana: 2014

Colombia U20
 Toulon Tournament: 2011

Individual
 Serie A Team of the Year: 2018–19

References

External links

Profile at the Atalanta B.C. website

1991 births
Living people
Colombian people of African descent
People from Cauca Department
Footballers from Cali
Colombian footballers
Association football forwards
América de Cali footballers
Estudiantes de La Plata footballers
S.S.C. Napoli players
Udinese Calcio players
U.C. Sampdoria players
Atalanta B.C. players
Categoría Primera A players
Categoría Primera B players
Argentine Primera División players
Serie A players
Colombia under-20 international footballers
Colombia international footballers
2019 Copa América players
2021 Copa América players
Colombian expatriate footballers
Colombian expatriate sportspeople in Argentina
Colombian expatriate sportspeople in Italy
Expatriate footballers in Argentina
Expatriate footballers in Italy